Serena Williams and Venus Williams were the defending champions, but Serena withdrew from the tournament (due to an injury) and Venus chose not to participate with another player.
Martina Hingis and Anna Kournikova defeated Daniela Hantuchová and Arantxa Sánchez Vicario 6–2, 6–7(4–7), 6–1 in the final to win the title.

Seeds

Draw

Finals

Top half

Section 1

Section 2

Bottom half

Section 3

Section 4

External links
 2002 Australian Open – Women's draws and results at the International Tennis Federation

Women's Doubles
Australian Open (tennis) by year – Women's doubles
2002 in Australian women's sport